An Ipswich window is a variety of oriel window in which the window juts out from the main wall on an upper floor without reaching down to the ground floor. However, its distinguishing feature which marks it as different from a Venetian window is in the arrangements of the panes of glass.

Richard Norman Shaw featured the Ipswich window in his design of the New Zealand Chambers, Leadenhall Street, London. This was built in 1871–73, but was destroyed by bombing during the Second World War.

Gallery

References

Windows
Architectural elements
Ipswich